The 1990 Troy State Trojans football team represented Troy State University (now known as Troy University) as a member of the Gulf South Conference (GSC) during the 1990 NCAA Division II football season. Led by third-year head coach Robert Maddox, the Trojans compiled an overall record of 5–5, with a mark of 4–4 in conference play, and finished tied for fifth in the GSC.

Schedule

References

Troy State
Troy Trojans football seasons
Troy State Trojans football